The Boca Beacon is an American newspaper based in Boca Grande. The paper was founded in 1980 by Marnie Banks, but currently the newspaper is owned by Hopkins & Daughter Publishing. The newspapers headquarters are at 431 Park Avenue Boca Grande, FL 33921.

History 
The newspaper was founded by Marnie Banks, with some help from Jack Harper, in 1980. It was first published from the old Kuhl house on Palm Avenue and printed in Clearwater. Afterwards, in May 1980 Banks's parents aided her to buy Jack Harper out. Banks then extended the newspaper's reach to the surrounding barrier islands, Placida and Cape Haze. At that time there were about 1,150 people subscribed to the newspaper.

As time went on Banks wanted the Boca Beacon to become a weekly paper. However, she knew that it would take too much work and had realized that there were other goals that she wanted to pursue and decided to find a new owner for the newspaper.

On July 27, 1988, the ownership of the newspaper transitioned to Dusty Hopkins and Terry Hopkins. Terry Hopkins had extensive experience in newspaper business and had just left Fort Myers News Press that same year. In addition, both Terry and Dusty Hopkins had worked for newspapers in August, Portland and Waterville, Maine as well as in New York at The Ithaca Journal, in Washington D.C. and Connecticut. They both moved to the Gasparilla Island shortly before they purchased the paper. Afterwards, they purchased the Gulfcoast Press and printed the newspaper in the Naples. Currently, the Boca Beacon is printed at the Venice Gondolier newspaper.

Coverage 
The newspaper is in circulation to the surrounding barrier islands, Placida and Cape Haze. The online website's news section of the Boca Beacon is divided into 7 sections: Spotlight, Featured News, Breaking News, Editorial, Obituaries, Letter to Editor and  Commentary.

Fishing Center 
On the online website of the Boca Beacon there is a section that's dedicated to the Tide Table for Boca Grande, FL Station ID 8725520 as well as it provides fishing reports.

Boca Grande's Community Calendar 
This section of their website provides information on the various events in Boca Grande.

Significant Stories 
One of the more significant stories of the newspaper is about the Gasparilla Island Lighthouse campaign. The Boca Beacon extensively covered the need to restore both the Gasparilla Island Light and Port of Boca Lighthouse. Currently the Port of Boca Lighthouse has received state funding under the historic restoration category through an amendment (995154) that was proposed by Florida Senator Lizbeth Benacquisto (R-Fort Myers).

Awards 
2016 Florida Press Association Better Weekly Newspaper contest
 First place award issued to Leighton Ingram for his fishing column titled “An Old Skiff and a New Tide”
 First place award issued to Editor Marcy Shortuse for her Arts, Entertainment and Review Reporting on Taste of Boca.
 Second place award issued to Editor Marcy Shortuse for her sports column titled, “There are a Lot of Legends in Boca Grande Pass”
 Second place award issued to Editor Marcy Shortuse and Art Director Daniel Godwin for Tarpon Times.
 Third place award issued to Writer Susan Erwin for Best Headline called “100 Trillion Friends You Didn’t Know You Had,”
 Third place award issued to Writer Susan Erwin in the Outdoor & Recreation field for her story on Silver Creek Preserve.
 Third place award issued to Writer Susan Erwin in the Arts, Entertainment and Review Reporting category for her story on Ingrid Bergman's daughter.
 Third place award issued to Editor Marcy Shortuse in the General News Story category for her story titled, “Saying Good-Bye to the Old Boca Grande Swing.”
 Third place award issued to Beacon cartoonist Dave Horton for “Hortoons.”
 Third place award issued to Editor Marcy Shortuse in the Editorial Award category for her piece titled, “The Parking-Challenged Ghosts of Boca Grande.”

2017 Florida Press Association Better Weekly Newspaper contest
 First place award issued to Art Director Daniel Godwin and Editor Marcy Shortuse in the “Special Issue, Section or Supplement” category for the 2017 Tarpon Times.
 Second place award issued to Editor Marcy Shortuse in the “General Excellence” category and in the “Best Obituary” category.
 Second place award issued to Publisher Dusty Hopkins in the “Spot News Photo” category.
 Third place award issued to Freelance Photographer Skip Perry in the “Spot News Photo” category.
 Third place award issued to Contributor Erica Ress-Martin in the “Arts, Entertainment and Review Reporting” category.
 Third place award issued to Writer Sue Erwin in the “Community History” category.

2018 Florida Press Association Better Weekly Newspaper Contest
Art Director Daniel Godwin and Editor Marcy Shortuse took a first place in the “Special Issue, Section or Supplement” category for the 2017 Tarpon Times, and Shortuse took a second place in the “General Excellence” category and a second place in the “Best Obituary” category. Publisher Dusty Hopkins received a second place award in the “Spot News Photo” category, contributor Erica Ress-Martin took a third place award in the “Arts, Entertainment and Review Reporting” category, freelance photographer Skip Perry took a third place in the “Spot News Photo” category and writer Sue Erwin took home a third place award in the “Community History” category.

See also 
 List of newspapers in the United States
 List of Florida newspapers

References

External links 
 Boca Beacon Website 
 Boca Beacon Facebook Page

Newspapers published in Florida